|}

The Cooley Fillies Stakes is a Listed flat horse race in Ireland open to thoroughbred fillies and mares aged three years or older. It is run at Dundalk over a distance of 1 mile (1,609 metres), and it is scheduled to take place each year in late October or early November.

The race was first run in 2007.

Records

Most successful horse (2 wins):
 Surrounding – 2018, 2019

Leading jockey (2 wins):
 Johnny Murtagh – 	Fourpenny Lane (2009), Pearl Of Africa (2013)

Leading trainer (3 wins):
 Michael Halford – Kadra (2000), Surrounding (2018,2019)

Winners

See also
 Horse racing in Ireland
 List of Irish flat horse races

References
Racing Post:

Flat races in Ireland
Mile category horse races for fillies and mares
Dundalk Stadium
Recurring sporting events established in 2007
2007 establishments in Ireland